Events in the year 2014 in Germany.

Incumbents

Federal level

 President: Joachim Gauck
 Chancellor: Angela Merkel

State level
 Minister-President of Baden-Wuerttemberg – Winfried Kretschmann
 Minister-President of Bavaria – Horst Seehofer
 Mayor of Berlin – Klaus Wowereit
 Minister-President of Brandenburg – Dietmar Woidke
 Mayor of Bremen – Jens Boehrnsen
 Mayor of Hamburg – Olaf Scholz
 Minister-President of Hesse – Volker Bouffier
 Minister-President of Mecklenburg-Vorpommern – Erwin Sellering
 Minister-President of Niedersachsen – Stephan Weil
 Minister-President of North Rhine-Westphalia – Hannelore Kraft
 Minister-President of Rhineland-Palatinate – Malu Dreyer
 Minister-President of Saarland – Annegret Kramp-Karrenbauer
 Minister-President of Saxony – Stanislaw Tillich
 Minister-President of Saxony-Anhalt – Reiner Haseloff
 Minister-President of Schleswig-Holstein – Torsten Albig
 Minister-President of Thuringia – Christine Lieberknecht

Events

January
 January  – Bavarian Film Awards in Munich
 January - German Snooker Masters in Berlin
 6 January - 100th birthday of German art dealer Heinz Berggruen
 28–1 January, 200th deathday of German king Karl der Große
 29 January - 200th deathday of German philosoph Johann Gottlieb Fichte

February
 6 to 16 February – 64th Berlin International Film Festival in Berlin
 February - Germany in the Eurovision Song Contest 2014

March
 March  – CeBIT in Hanover
 March  – ITB Berlin in Berlin
 March – Leipzig Book Fair in Leipzig
 7 March - 300th year of Treaty of Rastatt

April
 April – Hanover Messe in Hanover
 April – Deutscher Filmpreis in Berlin

May
 24 May - 100th birthday of German actress Lilli Palmer

June
 June  – Kiel Week in Kiel

July

 13 July - The Germany national team becomes world champion in Brazil.
 18 July -
 4 Germans are confirmed as among the 300 people on board killed in Malaysia Airlines Flight MH17 with 193 Dutch nationals in Eastern Ukraine near Russian border.
 26 2014 IPC Shooting World Championships
 28 July - 100th year of start World War I

August
 August – Hanse Sail in Rostock
 13 to 24 August - 2014 European Aquatics Championships
 27 August - 100th birthday of German actress Heidi Kabel
 August- September – Internationale Funkausstellung Berlin in Berlin

September
 September – ILA Berlin Air Show in Berlin
 September – Gamescom in Cologne
 September – photokina 2014 in Cologne
 September – Frankfurt Motor Show in Frankfurt
 26 September - 100th deathday of German painter August Macke
 September - October – Oktoberfest in Munich

October
 October – Frankfurt Book Fair

November
 5 November - 600th year of start of Council of Constance

Deaths

January 

 2 January - Thomas Kurzhals (60), German composer (born 1953)
 2 January - Dirk Sager (73), German journalist (born 1940)
 9 January - Winfried Hassemer (74), German criminal law scholar (born 1940)
 22 January - Fred Bertelmann (88), German singer (born 1925)
 31 January - Gundi Busch (78), German figure skater (born 1935)

February 
 2 February - Gerd Albrecht (78), German conductor (born 1935)
 4 February - Hubert Luthe, German bishop of Roman Catholic Church (born 1927) 
 6 February - Peter Philipp (42), German writer and comedian (born 1971)
 17 February - Peter Florin (92), German politician and diplomat (born 1921)
 18 February - Bernd Noske (67), German singer and drummer (born 1946)
 24 February - Günter Reisch (86), German film director and screenwriter (born 1927)
 25 February - Wilfried Brauer (76), German computer scientist (born 1937)

March 
 1 March - Eckart Höfling (77), German Roman Catholic priest in Brazil (born 1936)
 7 March - Heiko Bellmann (63), German biologist and zoologist (born 1950)
 9 March - Justus Pfaue (72), German author and director (born 1942)
 14 March - Werner Rackwitz (84), German opera director (born 1929)

April 

 3 April - Michael Prinz von Preußen (74), German writer and royalty (born 1940)
 4 April - Klaus Meyer (76), German footballer (born 1937)
 8 April - Herbert Schoen (84), German footballer (born 1929)
 8 April - Karlheinz Deschner (89), German writer (born 1924)
 11 April - Helga Mees (76), German fencer (born 1937)
 11 April - Eduard Gaugler (85), German economist (born 1928)
 21 April - Ilse von Bredow (91), German writer (born 1922)
 22 April - Werner Potzernheim (87), German cyclist (born 1927)
 25 April - Stefanie Zweig (81), German writer (born 1932)
 26 April - Adolf Seilacher (89), German palaeontologist (born 1925)

May 
 1 May - Heinz Schenk (89), German television presenter (born 1924)
 1 May - Georg Stollenwerk (83), German footballer and trainer (born 1930)
 6 May - Cornelius Gurlitt (81), German art collector (born 1932)
 14 May - Wolfgang Heyl, politician (born 1921)
 16 May - Rolf Boysen (94), German actor (born 1920)
 23 May - Richard Kolitsch (24), German footballer  (born 1989)
 30 May - Michael Szameit (63), German writer (born 1950)

June 
 4 June - Kurt Conradi (89), German actor (born 1924)
 6 June - Hermann Bahlsen (86), German manager (born 1927)
 9 June -  Reinhard Höppner (65), German politician (born 1948)
 12 June - Frank Schirrmacher (54), German journalist and essayist (born 1959)
 21 June - Johannes Strassmann (29), German poker player (born 1985)
 22 June - Werner Biskup (72), German football player (born 1942)
 28 June - Peter Klose (60), German politician (born 1953)

July 
 5 July - Hans-Ulrich Wehler, German historian (born 1931)
 7 July - Horst Bollmann, German actor (born 1925)
 14 July - Karl Düsterberg (97), German manager (born 1917)
 15 July - Edda Buding (77, German tennis player (born 1936)
 16 July - Karl Albrecht (94), German manager (born 1920)
 21 July - Hans-Peter Kaul (70), German judge (born 1943)
 30 July - Harun Farocki (70), German film director (born 1944)

August 

 1 August - Gert von Paczensky (88), German journalist (born 1925)
 2 August - Otmar Hornbach (84), German manager (born 1930)
 5 August - Elfriede Brüning (103), German writer (born 1910)
 10 August - Günter Junghans (73), German actor (born 1941)
 15 August - Hermann Weber (92), German historian (born 1928)
 16 August - Peter Scholl-Latour (90), German journalist (born 1924)
 20 August - Klaus Zapf (62), German manager (born 1952)
 20 August - Gert Schaefer (58), German actor (born 1955)
 21 August - Werner Liersch (81), German writer (born 1932)
 24 August - Walter Pradt (65), German football player (born 1949)
 25 August - Karl Ganzhorn (93), German physicist (born 1921)
 27 August - Benno Pludra (88), German writer (born 1925)

September 

 1 September - Gottfried John (72), German actor (born 1942)
 4 September - Wolfhart Pannenberg (85), German theologian (born 1928)
 11 September - Joachim Fuchsberger, German actor and television moderator (born 1927)
 20 September - Anton-Günther, Duke of Oldenburg (born 1923)

October 

 3 October - Peer Augustinski (74), German actor (born 1940)
 7 October - Siegfried Lenz (88), German  writer (born 1926)

November 
 1 November - Klaus Bölling (86), German publisher (born 1928)
 8 November – Hannes Hegen (89), German cartoonist and illustrator (born 1925)
 13 November - Alexander Grothendieck (86), German-born mathematician (born 1928)
 19 November - Mike Nichols (83), German-born American director (born 1931)

December 

 9 December - Karl Otto Pöhl (85), German economist (born 1929) 
 10 December - Ralph Giordano (89), German writer (born 1923)
 13 December - Ernst Albrecht (84), German politician (born 1930)
 14 December - Alois Graf von Waldburg-Zeil, German politician (born 1933) 
 22 December - Fritz Sdunek (67), German boxing trainer and amateur boxer (born 1947)
29 December - André Wohllebe, German canoeist(born 1962)
 30 December - Luise Rainer (104), German born actress (born 1910)

See also
2014 in German television

References

 
Years of the 21st century in Germany
2010s in Germany
Germany
Germany